Alan Hughes (born 19 October 1963) is an Irish television personality, pantomime actor and producer. He works for Virgin Media and appears on Ireland AM. He also hosted Family Fortunes from 2012 to 2014.

In the 1990s, he hosted the RTÉ game show Talk About for three years.

Since the 1990's Hughes has co-produced and starred in pantomimes, usually playing the camp character Sammy Sausages with his "tanx a thousand!" catchphrase.

In 2009, Hughes faced a health scare when there were fears he had stomach cancer.

In September 2011, Hughes engaged in a civil partnership with his partner of 18 years, Karl Broderick, a songwriter, at the Unitarian Church in St Stephen's Green, Dublin. The wedding, on the 18th anniversary of their meeting, was described by The Irish Times as the highest profile wedding since legislation permitting it to take place was brought in. Close friend Derek Mooney was his best man. The couple appeared on The Saturday Night Show soon afterwards in their first public interview together.

Hughes was nominated in the Favourite Male TV Presenter category at the 2009 TV Now Awards.

Panto.ie
Hughes and husband Broderick, as Panto.ie/Anthem productions, have produced pantomimes since the 1990's. It was known for sponsorship reasons as the Ambrosia Splat Panto, and the Cheerios Panto. Hughes usually plays the camp character Sammy Sausages with his "tanx a thousand!" catchphrase, with Rob Murphy playing Buffy. Venues have included the Tivoli, Saint Anthony's Theatre, Liberty Hall Theatre, and the National Stadium. Productions in 2020 and 2021 were affected by the  impact of COVID-19. For 2020, a drive-in show, Peter Pan, was staged at Malahide Castle. The 2021/22 production Aladdin, was curtailed due to a spike in infections.

Productions have included performances by Brian Dowling, Nadia Forde, Jake Carter, Niamh Kavanagh and pre-recorded pieces by broadcasters Joe Duffy and Marty Morrissey.

References

External links
Panto.ie

Living people
Ireland AM hosts
Irish game show hosts
Irish LGBT broadcasters
Irish gay actors
Pantomime
RTÉ television presenters
1963 births
21st-century LGBT people